Vincent Pellet Kennedy (July 11. 1824 – February 3, 1903) was an American physician and politician.

Kennedy was born in western Pennsylvania near Pittsburgh, Pennsylvania. He graduated from Asbury University in 1849 and received his medical degree from Rush Medical College in 1851. Kennedy moved to Minnesota in 1856 and lived in Greenleaf, Meeker County, Minnesota with his wife and family. He served in the 5th Minnesota Infantry Regiment during the American Civil War. Kennedy served in the Minnesota House of Representatives in 1861 and 1862 and in the Dakota Territorial Legislature in 1885. Kennedy died in Litchfield, Minnesota.

References

1824 births
1903 deaths
People from Pennsylvania
People from Meeker County, Minnesota
Asbury University alumni
Rush Medical College alumni
People of Minnesota in the American Civil War
Physicians from Minnesota
Members of the Dakota Territorial Legislature
Members of the Minnesota House of Representatives